The vice chief of space operations (VCSO) is an office held by a four-star general in the United States Space Force. The vice chief directly supports the chief of space operations (CSO) by serving as a member of the Joint Requirements Oversight Council (JROC) and also operates with the full authority of the chief of space operations during the CSO’s absence. The VCSO is nominated for appointment by the president and confirmed by the Senate. The VCSO is the second-highest position in the U.S. Space Force, equivalent to other services' vice chief positions.

History 

In February 2020, the Space Force sent a report to the United States Congress on the service's proposed organizational structure, in which it outlines the plan for the position of the vice chief of space operations. The VCSO would be established as a four-star statutory position with duties and responsibilities equivalent to other service vice positions that would grant the VCSO parity with vice positions established in law in the other military services.

On August 6, 2020, Lieutenant General David D. Thompson was nominated for promotion to general and assignment as the first VCSO. The United States Senate confirmed him on September 30, 2020. Thompson was promoted on October 1, 2020, and assumed the position of VCSO the next day, October 2, 2020.

List of vice chiefs of space operations

Timeline

See also 
 Secretary of the Air Force
 Chief of Space Operations
 Vice Chief of Staff of the Army
 Assistant Commandant of the Marine Corps
 Vice Chief of Naval Operations
 Vice Chief of Staff of the Air Force
 Vice Commandant of the Coast Guard

References 

United States Space Force
Vice chiefs of staff